Gabriel Ynoa Gómez (born May 26, 1993) is a Dominican professional baseball pitcher for the Pericos de Puebla of the Mexican Baseball League. He previously played in Major League Baseball (MLB) for the New York Mets and Baltimore Orioles, in Nippon Professional Baseball (NPB) for the Tokyo Yakult Swallows, and in the Chinese Professional Baseball League (CPBL) for the CTBC Brothers.

Career

New York Mets
Ynoa signed with the New York Mets as an international free agent in November 2009. He made his professional debut that season with the Dominican Summer League Mets. Pitching for the Savannah Sand Gnats in 2013, Ynoa was named the South Atlantic League Pitcher of the Year, after winning 15 games and recording a 2.72 earned run average (ERA). Ynoa started 2014 with the St. Lucie Mets and was promoted to the Double-A Binghamton Mets during the season.

Ynoa was called up to the major leagues for the first time on August 13, 2016. That night, he pitched a perfect 11th inning against the San Diego Padres at Citi Field to record a win in his major league debut.

Baltimore Orioles
On February 10, 2017, Ynoa was traded to the Baltimore Orioles for cash considerations. Ynoa made his debut with the Orioles on May 5 after being brought in from the bullpen in the first inning after Orioles' starter Wade Miley left the game with a wrist contusion. Ynoa threw six scoreless innings, allowing six hits while striking out five batters. It was Ynoa's longest career outing. He earned the victory in a 4-2 Orioles win. He missed the entire 2018 season with a right shin stress reaction. He was outrighted on November 1, then signed a minor league deal for the 2019 season.

Ynoa started the 2019 season with the Norfolk Tides. The Orioles promoted him to the major leagues on April 21. When his record fell to 1–10 as a result of  a 3–2 defeat to the Toronto Blue Jays at Rogers Centre on September 25, he and David Hess became the first pair of teammates with double-digit losses and no more than one win since Jack Nabors and Tom Sheehan of the 1916 Philadelphia Athletics. Ynoa was outrighted off the Orioles roster on November 4, and elected free agency.

Tokyo Swallows
On December 6, 2019, Ynoa signed with the Tokyo Yakult Swallows of Nippon Professional Baseball (NPB). 

On June 23, 2020, Ynoa made his NPB debut. On October 12, 2020, he became a free agent.

CTBC Brothers
On December 27, 2020, Ynoa signed with the CTBC Brothers of the Chinese Professional Baseball League (CPBL). On March 13, 2021, Ynoa made his CPBL debut against the Uni-President 7-Eleven Lions. Ynoa made 24 appearances for the Brothers, going 3-3 with a 4.01 ERA and 61 strikeouts. On October 4, 2021, Ynoa was released by the Brothers.

Pericos de Puebla
On March 30, 2022, Ynoa signed with the Pericos de Puebla of the Mexican Baseball League for the 2022 season.

References

External links

1993 births
Living people
Baltimore Orioles players
Binghamton Mets players
Bowie Baysox players
Brooklyn Cyclones players
Dominican Republic expatriate baseball players in Japan
Dominican Republic expatriate baseball players in Mexico
Dominican Republic expatriate baseball players in Taiwan
Dominican Republic expatriate baseball players in the United States
Dominican Summer League Mets players
Gigantes del Cibao players
Gulf Coast Mets players
Kingsport Mets players
Las Vegas 51s players
Major League Baseball pitchers
Major League Baseball players from the Dominican Republic
New York Mets players
Nippon Professional Baseball pitchers
Norfolk Tides players
Pericos de Puebla players
Savannah Sand Gnats players
St. Lucie Mets players
Tokyo Yakult Swallows players
People from La Vega, Dominican Republic